Wesley is an early American sitcom that aired live on CBS from May 8, 1949 to August 30, 1949.

Premise
The series centered on 12-year-old Wesley Eggleston, who lived in a small rural community, and his family, including his sister Elizabeth.

Cast
Donald Devlin as Wesley Eggleston-May–July
Johnny Steward as Wesley Eggleston-July–August
Frank Thomas as Mr. Eggleston
Mona Thomas as Mrs. Eggleston
Joy Reese as Elizabeth Eggleston
Joe Sweeney as Grandpa
Billie Nevard as Alvin

References

1940s American sitcoms
1949 American television series debuts
1949 American television series endings
CBS original programming
American live television series
Black-and-white American television shows